The 2007 Georgia Southern Eagles football team represented Georgia Southern University in the 2007 NCAA Division I FCS football season.

Schedule

Game summaries

West Georgia
It was a successful coaching debut for Chris Hatcher, who took over as Eagles coach after winning a national championship at Valdosta State in NCAA Division II. He was brought on to restore Georgia Southern's prestige as a Football Championship Subdivision powerhouse again after finishing 3–8 last season, the last when the division was recognized as 1-AA.

Coastal Carolina
Jayson Foster ran for 253 yards and six touchdowns to lead Georgia Southern past Coastal Carolina 42–34 on Saturday night...The Eagles (2v0) also got 206 yards from Lamar Lewis on 18 carries, including a 63-yard run.

Chattanooga
It was the Southern Conference opener for both teams. Georgia Southern (2–1, 0–1) got another outstanding night from quarterback Jayson Foster who rushed for 210 yards and completed 16 of 19 passes for 120 yards.

Western Carolina
Jayson Foster ran for one touchdown and threw for another while completing all 10 of his passes to lead Georgia Southern to a 50–21 Southern Conference victory over Western Carolina on Saturday.  Foster, who led Division I Football Championship Subdivision rushers with an average of 231.2 yards per game, had only 96 yards rushing, but he was effective throwing the football.  The 5-foot-9, 164-pound senior was 10-for-10 passing for 147 yards, including a 29-yard scoring pass to Michael McIntosh. Foster is now 27-for-30 in his last two games and his perfect performance against the Catamounts was a new school single game completion record.

South Dakota State
Jesse Hartley kicked a 54-yard field goal on the final play of the game to give Georgia Southern a 41–38 victory over South Dakota State on Saturday....Hartley's game winning kick, a career long, was set up by an interception by Carson Hill with 21 seconds remaining. The Jackrabbits got the ball back with 31 seconds to play and the score tied but chose not to sit on it.

Elon
The Phoenix (4–2, 2–1 Southern Conference) beat the Eagles for the first time in eight games....Hartley, who made a 49-yard try in the second quarter as one of his four field goals, missed a 38-yard attempt in the second overtime as the Eagles gained only 4 yards in three downs. The Phoenix actually lost 7 yards in three plays before Wilcox made the winning kick.

Appalachian State
Lamar Lewis ran for 74 yards and two touchdowns, including a key fourth-quarter score, as Georgia Southern held off an Appalachian State rally Saturday and took a 38–35 victory in the Southern Conference.

The Citadel
Jayson Foster scored a pair touchdowns in the fourth quarter to help Georgia Southern rally late in a 21–17 win over The Citadel on Saturday....Foster also completed 11-of-16 passes for 106 yards. Lamar Lewis chipped in on the running game, gaining 82 yards on 18 carries.

Wofford
Jayson Foster had 279 rushing yards and three touchdowns to lead Georgia Southern a 38–35 victory over Wofford on Saturday....With the game tied at 35, Georgia Southern (7–2, 4–2 Southern Conference) had a 45-yard kickoff return to set up the game-winning field goal with 8:58 left in the game.

Furman

Colorado State
Gartrell Johnson ran for two touchdowns and caught a touchdown pass, leading Colorado State to a 42–34 victory over Georgia Southern Saturday.  Johnson finished with 136 yards on the ground. Caleb Hanie completed 13-of-16 passes for 244 yards and two touchdowns, and Damon Morton caught four passes for 100 yards and a score for Colorado State (2–9)....Quarterback Jayson Foster ran for 195 yards on 27 carries and scored three touchdowns for the Eagles. He also threw for 107 yards for Georgia Southern (7-4).

References

Georgia Southern
Georgia Southern Eagles football seasons
Georgia Southern Eagles football